Collón Curá is a department located in the southeast of Neuquén Province, Argentina.

Geography
The Department limits with Catán Lil Department at north, Picún Leufú Department at northeast, Rio Negro Province at east and southeast, Lácar Department at southwest and Huiliches Department at northwest.  

Departments of Neuquén Province
Mapuche language